The following television stations broadcast on digital channel 15 in the United States:

 K15AA-D in Hugo, Oklahoma
 K15AF-D in Petersburg, Alaska
 K15AL-D in Winnemucca, Nevada
 K15AP-D in Moose Pass, Alaska
 K15AS-D in Saco, Montana
 K15AT-D in Kodiak, Alaska
 K15AU-D in Pilot Station, Alaska
 K15BP-D in Grants Pass, Oregon
 K15CD-D in Mayfield, Utah
 K15CR-D in Lake Havasu City, Arizona
 K15CU-D in Salinas, California
 K15CX-D in Oroville, California
 K15DS-D in Newport, etc., Oregon, on virtual channel 12, which rebroadcasts K18EL-D
 K15ED-D in Waunita Hot Springs, Colorado, on virtual channel 8, which rebroadcasts KTSC
 K15EE-D in Elko, Nevada
 K15FC-D in Twentynine Palms, California, on virtual channel 15
 K15FD-D in Holyoke, Colorado, on virtual channel 2, which rebroadcasts KWGN-TV
 K15FJ-D in Lakeport, California, on virtual channel 15, which rebroadcasts KKPM-CD
 K15FL-D in Park City, Utah, on virtual channel 2, which rebroadcasts KUTV
 K15FQ-D in Milford, etc., Utah
 K15FT-D in Roswell, New Mexico
 K15FV-D in Red River, New Mexico
 K15GL-D in Trinidad, Valdez, etc., Colorado
 K15GO-D in Georgetown, Idaho
 K15GT-D in Hibbing, Minnesota
 K15GU-D in Dove Creek, etc., Colorado, on virtual channel 15
 K15GZ-D in Wendover, Utah
 K15HC-D in Quemado/Pie Town, New Mexico
 K15HD-D in Taos, New Mexico
 K15HE-D in Hatch, Utah
 K15HG-D in Mount Pleasant, Utah, on virtual channel 2, which rebroadcasts KUTV
 K15HH-D in Green River, Utah
 K15HJ-D in Ridgecrest, etc., California, on virtual channel 46, which rebroadcasts KFTR-DT
 K15HK-D in Sheridan, Wyoming
 K15HL-D in Cherokee & Alva, Oklahoma
 K15HM-D in Montezuma Crk./Aneth, Utah
 K15HN-D in Bluff & area, Utah
 K15HQ-D in Sayre, Oklahoma
 K15HR-D in Mackay, Idaho
 K15HU-D in Lakeview, Oregon
 K15HV-D in Chico, California
 K15HY-D in Williams-Ashfork, Arizona, on virtual channel 3, which rebroadcasts KTVK
 K15IA-D in Orderville, Utah
 K15IB-D in Malad, Idaho
 K15IF-D in Basalt, Colorado
 K15IG-D in Deming, New Mexico
 K15II-D in Newcastle, Wyoming
 K15IM-D in Brookings, etc., Oregon
 K15IO-D in McCall & New Meadows, Idaho
 K15IQ-D in Astoria, Oregon
 K15IS-D in Willmar, Minnesota
 K15IX-D in Rainier, Oregon, on virtual channel 32, which rebroadcasts KRCW-TV
 K15IY-D in Heron, Montana
 K15IZ-D in Edgemont, South Dakota
 K15JA-D in Harlowton, etc., Montana
 K15JG-D in Scottsburg, Oregon
 K15JL-D in Billings, Montana
 K15JO-D in Chama, New Mexico
 K15JV-D in Mexican Hat, Utah
 K15JZ-D in Applegate Valley, Oregon
 K15KB-D in Squaw Valley, Oregon
 K15KC-D in Yakima, Washington
 K15KE-D in Klamath Falls, etc., Oregon
 K15KF-D in Coos Bay, Oregon
 K15KG-D in Eads, etc., Colorado
 K15KJ-D in Gold Hill, Oregon
 K15KK-D in Mt. Powell, New Mexico
 K15KL-D in Jacksonville, Oregon
 K15KM-D in Sundance, Wyoming
 K15KN-D in Roseburg, Oregon
 K15KO-D in Redding, California
 K15KP-D in St. Louis, Missouri, on virtual channel 15
 K15KQ-D in Coalville, Utah
 K15KR-D in Poplar, Montana
 K15KS-D in Garfield, etc., Utah
 K15KT-D in Rural Sevier County, Utah
 K15KU-D in Teasdale/Torrey, Utah
 K15KV-D in Rockaway Beach, Oregon
 K15KW-D in Philipsburg, Montana
 K15KX-D in Circleville, Utah
 K15KY-D in Richfield, etc., Utah, on virtual channel 4, which rebroadcasts KTVX
 K15KZ-D in Koosharem, Utah
 K15LA-D in Panguitch, Utah
 K15LB-D in Red Lodge, Montana
 K15LC-D in Henrieville, Utah
 K15LD-D in Lewistown, Montana
 K15LE-D in Heber City, Utah, on virtual channel 14, which rebroadcasts KJZZ-TV
 K15LG-D in Hawthorne, Nevada
 K15LI-D in Sterling, Colorado, on virtual channel 9, which rebroadcasts KUSA
 K15LJ-D in Enterprise, etc., Utah
 K15LK-D in Scipio, Utah
 K15LL-D in Leamington, Utah
 K15LM-D in McAlester, Oklahoma
 K15LO-D in Fruitland, Utah
 K15LP-D in Rural Carbon County, Utah
 K15LQ-D in Orangeville, Utah, on virtual channel 2, which rebroadcasts KUTV
 K15LR-D in Meadview, Arizona
 K15LU-D in Eureka, Nevada
 K15LW-D in Utahn, Utah
 K15LY-D in Ruth, Nevada
 K15LZ-D in Tucumcari, New Mexico
 K15MB-D in Kansas City, Missouri
 K15MD-D in Wray, Colorado, on virtual channel 31, which rebroadcasts KDVR
 K15ME-D in Salmon, Idaho
 K15MF-D in Raton, etc., New Mexico
 K15MH-D in Anton, Colorado, on virtual channel 31, which rebroadcasts KDVR
 K15MI-D in Centralia/Chehalis, Washington, on virtual channel 22, which rebroadcasts KZJO
 K15MP-D in Rawlins, Wyoming
 K15MR-D in Fargo, North Dakota
 K15MW-D in Bellingham, Washington
 K15MY-D in Caputa, South Dakota
 K39CH-D in Redwood Falls, Minnesota, on virtual channel 15
 K51DB-D in Cortez, etc., Colorado
 KBSV in Ceres, California, on virtual channel 23
 KBTU-LD in Salt Lake City, Utah
 KCIT in Amarillo, Texas
 KELV-LD in Las Vegas, Nevada
 KETD in Castle Rock, Colorado, on virtual channel 53
 KFDM in Beaumont, Texas
 KFOX-TV in El Paso, Texas
 KFQX in Grand Junction, Colorado
 KFVD-LD in Porterville, California
 KFXL-TV in Lincoln, Nebraska
 KFXO-CD in Bend, Oregon
 KGFE in Grand Forks, North Dakota
 KHOG-TV in Fayetteville, Arkansas
 KHPL-CD in La Grange, Texas
 KHQ-TV in Spokane, Washington
 KIUA-LD in Lincoln, Nebraska
 KJTL in Wichita Falls, Texas
 KKJB in Boise, Idaho
 KLMV-LD in Laredo, Texas
 KMLM-DT in Odessa, Texas
 KMOS-TV in Sedalia, Missouri
 KMSQ-LD in Mesquite, Nevada
 KNPB in Reno, Nevada
 KNPB in Truckee/Lake Tahoe, Nevada
 KNPN-LD in Saint Joseph, Missouri, on virtual channel 26
 KNXV-TV in Phoenix, Arizona, on virtual channel 15
 KOOG-LD in Bozeman, Montana
 KORY-CD in Eugene, Oregon
 KOXO-CD in Portland, Oregon, an ATSC 3.0 station, on virtual channel 41
 KPIF in Pocatello, Idaho
 KPOB-TV in Poplar Bluff, Missouri
 KREZ-TV in Durango, Colorado
 KRHD-CD in Bryan, Texas
 KSBY in San Luis Obispo, California
 KSMN in Worthington, Minnesota
 KSNW in Wichita, Kansas
 KSRE in Minot, North Dakota
 KTBO-TV in Oklahoma City, Oklahoma
 KTEL-CD in Albuquerque, New Mexico
 KTLD-CD in Bakersfield, California
 KUKL-TV in Kalispell, Montana
 KUNA-LD in Indio, California
 KUPU in Waimanalo, Hawaii
 KUTO-LD in Logan, Utah, on virtual channel 15
 KVCW (DRT) in Pahrump, Nevada, an ATSC 3.0 station
 KVDA in San Antonio, Texas
 KVTX-LD in Victoria, Texas
 KVVK-CD in Kennewick, etc., Washington
 KVVV-LD in Houston, Texas, on virtual channel 15
 KWJM-LD in Minneapolis, Minnesota, on virtual channel 15
 KXAP-LD in Tulsa, Oklahoma
 KXBK-LD in Bismarck, North Dakota
 KXVA in Abilene, Texas
 KYOU-TV in Ottumwa, Iowa
 KYTX in Nacogdoches, Texas
 KYUB-LD in Yuba City, California, on virtual channel 36, which rebroadcasts KKPM-CD
 KYUK-LD in Bethel, Alaska
 KYUM-LD in Yuma, Arizona
 KZAU-LD in Killeen, Texas
 W15BU-D in Johnson City, Illinois
 W15CO-D in Towanda, Pennsylvania
 W15CW-D in Franklin, North Carolina
 W15DC-D in Florence, South Carolina
 W15DF-D in Houghton Lake, Michigan
 W15DO-D in Norfolk, Virginia
 W15DS-D in Bangor, Maine
 W15DY-D in Marion, etc., North Carolina, on virtual channel 13, which rebroadcasts WLOS
 W15EA-D in Memphis, Tennessee
 W15EB-D in Charlotte, North Carolina, on virtual channel 21
 W15EE-D in Ashland, Wisconsin
 W15EF-D in Sparta, North Carolina
 W15EG-D in Corning, New York
 W15EL-D in Mars Hill, North Carolina, on virtual channel 7, which rebroadcasts WSPA-TV
 W15ES-D in Myrtle Beach, South Carolina
 WAFF in Huntsville, Alabama
 WBBH-TV in Fort Myers, Florida
 WBNF-CD in Buffalo, New York
 WBXM-CD in Montgomery, Alabama
 WCWF in Suring, Wisconsin
 WDCQ-TV in Bad Axe, Michigan
 WDCW in Washington, D.C., uses WFDC-DT's spectrum, on virtual channel 50
 WDDY-LD in Jackson, Tennessee
 WDKT-LD in Hendersonville, North Carolina, on virtual channel 31
 WDYL-LD in Louisville, Kentucky
 WEWS-TV in Cleveland, Ohio, on virtual channel 5
 WFDC-DT in Arlington, Virginia, on virtual channel 14
 WFXW in Greenville, Mississippi
 WGGD-LD in Gainesville, Georgia, on virtual channel 23
 WGME-TV in Portland, Maine
 WHLA-TV in La Crosse, Wisconsin
 WHPS-CD in Detroit, Michigan, on virtual channel 15
 WHWD-LD in Winston-Salem, North Carolina
 WICS in Springfield, Illinois
 WILM-LD in Wilmington, North Carolina
 WKHD-LD in Mayaguez, Puerto Rico
 WLCU-CD in Campbellsville, Kentucky
 WLTX in Columbia, South Carolina
 WMTJ in Fajardo, Puerto Rico, on virtual channel 40
 WMWD-LD in Madison, Wisconsin
 WNFT-LD in Gainesville, Florida
 WNOL-TV in New Orleans, Louisiana
 WNTZ-TV in Natchez, Mississippi
 WOHL-CD in Lima, Ohio
 WOOK-LD in Meridian, Mississippi
 WOTF-TV in Daytona Beach, Florida, on virtual channel 26
 WPBM-CD in Scottsville, Kentucky
 WPHJ-LD in Baxley, Georgia
 WPMI-TV in Mobile, Alabama
 WPSU-TV in Clearfield, Pennsylvania
 WQCW in Portsmouth, Ohio
 WQMC-LD in Columbus, Ohio, on virtual channel 23
 WRAZ in Raleigh, North Carolina, on virtual channel 50
 WRBL in Columbus, Georgia
 WREP-LD in Martinsville, Indiana, on virtual channel 15
 WRTD-CD in Raleigh, North Carolina, uses WRAZ's spectrum, on virtual channel 54
 WSSF-LD in Fayette, Alabama
 WTFL-LD in Tallahassee, Florida
 WTNX-LD in Nashville, Tennessee
 WTNZ in Knoxville, Tennessee
 WTTK in Kokomo, Indiana, an ATSC 3.0 station, on virtual channel 29
 WUDW-LD in Richmond, Virginia, on virtual channel 53
 WUJX-LD in Jacksonville, Florida
 WUSP-LD in Ponce, Puerto Rico, on virtual channel 25
 WXIX-TV in Newport, Kentucky, on virtual channel 19
 WXSP-CD in Grand Rapids, Michigan, an ATSC 3.0 station
 WYBM-LD in Westmoreland, New Hampshire
 WYYW-CD in Evansville, Indiana
 WZRA-CD in Oldsmar, Florida, on virtual channel 48

The following stations, which are no longer licensed, formerly broadcast on digital channel 15:
 K15AG-D in Ninilchik, Alaska
 K15IC-D in Weed, California
 K15IL-D in John Day, Oregon
 K15MA-D in Cottonwood, etc., Idaho
 KEID-LD in Lufkin, Texas
 WCYD-LD in Myrtle Beach, South Carolina
 WCZA-LD in Marion, Indiana
 WDDZ-LD in Augusta, Georgia
 WFDE-LD in Champaign, Illinois
 WLLB-LD in Portland, Maine
 WSFD-LD in Perry, Florida
 WWJS-CD in Clarksville, Indiana

References

15 digital